Tajik University of Law, Business and Politics is a university in Tajikistan. It is located in Dushanbe.

The architecture could be described as mid-60’s institutional.

Universities in Tajikistan
Education in Dushanbe